This Is My Life may refer to:

Albums 
 This Is My Life (Carly Simon album), 1992
 This Is My Life (Shirley Bassey album), a U.S. and UK release, 1968
 This Is My Life (La vita), an Italian release by Shirley Bassey, 1968
 This Is My Life, by Joe Dolan, 1987
 This Is My Life, by Tracy Hamlin, 2013

Songs 
 "This Is My Life" (Anna Bergendahl song), 2010
 "This Is My Life" (Edward Maya song), 2008
 "This Is My Life" (Elli Erl song), 2004
 "This Is My Life" (Eurobandið song), 2008
 "This Is My Life" ("La vita"), written by Bruno Canfora and Antonio Amurri in 1968, with English lyrics by Norman Newell
 "This Is My Life", by Dei Hamo from First Edition, 2005
 "This Is My Life", by Fefe Dobson from Sunday Love, 2006
 "This Is My Life", by Gasolin' from Efter endnu en dag, 1976
 "This Is My Life", by Hopsin, Ak'Sent, Tynisha Keli and Donte "Burger" Winston from the soundtrack of the film Fame, 2009
 "This Is My Life", by Joana Zimmer, theme of the German telenovela Rote Rosen, 2006–present
 "This Is My Life", by Phil Vassar from Prayer of a Common Man, 2007
 "This Is My Life", by Tom Jones from Mr. Jones, 2002
 "This Is My Life", by Tubeway Army from The Plan, 1984

Films 
 This Is My Life (1952 film), an Argentine film directed by Román Viñoly Barreto
 This Is My Life (1992 film), an American comedy-drama directed by Nora Ephron
 Uuno Turhapuro – This Is My Life, a 2004 Finnish comedy directed by Ere Kokkonen

See also 
 My Life (disambiguation)
 It's My Life (disambiguation)
 The Story of My Life (disambiguation)
 This Is the Life (disambiguation)
 This Is Your Life (disambiguation)